The Sultanate of Gowa (sometimes written as Goa; not to be confused with Goa in India) was one of the great kingdoms in the history of Indonesia and the most successful kingdom in the South Sulawesi region. People of this kingdom come from the Makassar tribe who lived in the south end and the west coast of southern Sulawesi.

History
Before the establishment of the kingdom, the region had been known as Makassar and its people as Suku Makassar (tribe of Makassar). The history of the kingdom can be divided into two eras: pre-Islamic kingdom and post-Islamic sultanate.

Pre-Islamic Kingdom

According to the epic poem the Nagarakretagama, in praise of King Rajasanagara of Majapahit, it lists Makassar as one of the kingdom's tributaries in 1365.

The first queen of Gowa was Tomanurung Baine. There is not much known about the exact time when the kingdom was established nor about the first queen, and only during the ruling of the 6th king, Tonatangka Kopi, local sources have noted about the division of the kingdom into two new kingdoms led by two Kopi's sons: Kingdom of Gowa led by Batara Gowa as its 7th king covering areas of Paccelekang, Pattalasang, Bontomanai Ilau, Bontomanai 'Iraya, Tombolo and Mangasa while the other son, Karaeng Loe ri Sero, led a new kingdom called Tallo which includes areas of Saumata, Pannampu, Moncong Loe, and Parang Loe.

For years both kingdoms were involved in wars until the kingdom of Tallo was defeated.  During the reign of King of Gowa X, I Manriwagau Daeng Bonto Karaeng Lakiung Tunipalangga Ulaweng (1512-1546), the two kingdoms were reunified to become twin kingdoms under a deal called Rua Kareng se're ata (dual kings, single people in Makassarese) and enforced with a binding treaty. Since then, when someone becomes a king of Tallo, he also becomes the king of Gowa.  Many historians then simply call these Gowa-Tallo  twin kingdoms as Makassar or just Gowa.

Islamic Sultanate

The traces of Islam in South Sulawesi existed since the 1320s with the arrival of the first Sayyid in South Sulawesi, namely Sayyid Jamaluddin al-Akbar Al-Husaini, who is the grandfather of Wali Songo.

The conversion of the kingdom to Islam is dated as September 22, 1605 when the 14th king of Tallo-Gowa kingdom, Karaeng Matowaya Tumamenaga Ri Agamanna, converted to Islam,  where later changed his name to Sultan Alauddin.  He ruled the kingdom from 1591 to 1629. His conversion to Islam is associated with the arrival of three ulama from Minangkabau: Datuk Ri Bandang, Datuk Ri Tiro and Datuk Ri Pattimang.

From 1630 until the early twentieth century, Gowa's political leaders and Islamic functionaries were both recruited from the ranks of the nobility.  Since 1607, sultans of Makassar established a policy of welcoming all foreign traders.  In 1613, an English factory built in Makassar.  This began the hostilities of English-Dutch against Makassar.

The most famous Sultan of the kingdom was Sultan Hasanuddin, who from 1666 to 1669 started a war known as Makassar War against the Dutch East India Company (VOC) which was assisted by the prince of Bone kingdom of Bugis dynasty, Arung Palakka.

Islamic wars
The Sultanate of Gowa's patronage of Islam caused it to try and encourage neighboring kingdoms to accept Islam, an offer which they refused. In response in 1611, the sultanate launched a series of campaigns, called locally the "Islamic wars", which resulted in all of southwest Sulawesi, including their rival Bone, being subjugated and subsequently Islamized. The war later extended to Sumbawa, which was invaded in 1618 and the rulers were forced to convert to Islam. Religious zeal from the rulers were an important factor behind the campaigns, as they saw the conquests as a justified religious act. However, Gowa also desired to expand the political and economic influence of Gowa as it experienced rapid political growth during the 17th century. It was a subsequent stage in a historical rivalry between the states of the region for political control.

According to Indonesian historian Daeng Patunru, in the case of the Bugis kingdoms, the ruler of Gowa initially conquered them due to their growing political power which would undermine Gowa's authority and sphere of influence. Other scholars contend that the conflict with the Bugis was originally started due to the upholding of an old treaty that stated that Gowa and the Bugis kingdoms were to share and convince the others if they were to discover "a spark of goodness" which in this case Gowa contended was the religion of Islam.

Varying levels of resistance against Gowa from nearby states to consider Islam and its military forces determined the relationship the defeated state would have with Gowa, which were based on socially hierarchical kinship positions. This included strict vassalage and defeated rulers and populations having subordinate or enslaved positions within the empire.  This scheme of hierarchical relations and subordinate positions in relation to a more powerful state has ancient roots in the region which predate Islam. The one difference added to this ancient tradition was that the defeated ruler had to profess the shahadah which also served as an acceptance of submission to Gowa. The defeated populations of the states were not commonly forced to convert.

After the conquests, Gowa pursued a policy of religious proselytization within the defeated kingdoms, which included sending Javanese preachers to teach the religion among the masses and establish Islamic institutions.

Dissolution of Sultanate
Since 1673 the area around Fort Rotterdam grew into a city currently known as Makassar. Since 1904 the Dutch colonial government had engaged in the South Sulawesi expedition and started war against small kingdoms in South Sulawesi, including Gowa. In 1911 the Sultanate lost its independence after losing the war and became one of the Dutch Indies' regencies. Following the Indonesian Independence from Netherlands in 1945, the sultanate dissolved and has since become part of the Republic of Indonesia and the former region becomes part of Gowa Regency.

Makassar War

In 1644, Bone rose up against Gowa. The Battle of Passempe saw Bone defeated and a regent heading an Islamic religious council installed. In 1660 Arung Palakka,  the long haired prince of the Sultanate of Bonu,  led a Bugis revolt against Gowa, but failed.

In 1666, under the command of Admiral Cornelis Speelman, The Dutch East India Company  (VOC) attempted to bring the small kingdoms in the North under their control, but did not manage to subdue the Sultanate of Gowa. After Sultan Hasanuddin ascended to the throne as the 16th sultan of Gowa, he tried to combine the power of the small kingdoms in eastern Indonesia to fight the VOC.

On the morning of 24 November 1666, the VOC expedition and the Eastern Quarters set sail under the command of Speelman.  The fleet consisted of the admiralship Tertholen, and twenty other vessels carrying some 1860 people, among them 818 Dutch sailors, 578 Dutch soldiers, and 395 native troops from Ambon under Captain Joncker and from Bugis under Arung Palakka and Arung Belo Tosa'deng. Speelman also accepted Sultan Ternate's offer to contribute a number of his war canoes for the war against Gowa. A week after June 19, 1667, Speelman's armada set sail toward Sulawesi and Makassar from Butung. When the fleet reached the Sulawesi coast, Speelman received news of the abortive Bugis uprising in Bone in May and of the disappearance of Arung Palakka during the crossing from the island of Kambaena.

The war later broke in 1666 between the VOC and the sultanate of Gowa.  The war continued until 1669, after the VOC had landed its strengthened troops in a desperate and ultimately weakening Gowa. On 18 November 1667 the Treaty of Bungaya was signed by the major belligerents in a premature attempt to end the war.

Feeling aggrieved, Hasanuddin  started the war again. Finally, the VOC requested assistance for additional troops from Batavia. Battles broke out again in various places with Sultan Hasanuddin giving fierce resistance. Military reinforcements sent from Batavia strengthened the VOC's military capability, allowing it to break the Sultanate of Gowa's strongest fortress in Somba Opu on June 12, 1669, which finally marked the end of the war. Sultan Hasanuddin resigned from the royal throne, dying on June 12, 1670.

After the Makassar war, Admiral Cornelis Speelman destroyed the large fortress in Somba Opu, and built up Fort Rotterdam (Speelman named this fortress after his birthplace in Netherlands) in its place as the headquarters of VOC activities in Sulawesi. In 1672 Arung Palakka was raised to the throne to become the sultan of Bone.

The war is considered the greatest war the VOC had ever had.

Government

Political administration
The variety of titles used by leaders of small polities is bewildering: anrongguru, dampang, gallarrang, jannang, kare, kasuiang, lao, loqmoq, todo, and more besides. All were local titles Makassarese used before the rise of Gowa. Gowa's expansion brought some systematic order to this variety.

Granting titles was an important method of establishing and recognizing a given person/s and a given community's place within society. Ideally, but not always in fact, this hierarchy of titles corresponded to the natural hierarchy of the white blood that the nobles possessed. Distinguishing nobles from commoners, for example, was the right to have a royal or daeng name as well as a personal name. Distinguishing lower ranking nobles such as anaq ceraq from higher-ranking nobles like anaq tiqno was the latter's right to a karaeng title. Granted by the ruler of Gowa, karaeng titles not only signified the bearer's accepted high status, but were often toponyms that gace the bearer the right to demand tribute and labor from the community of that name.

Offices did become the domain of the nobles with karaeng titles. The most important of these was Tumabicarabutta, whose task it was to assist the ruler of Gowa as regent and chief advisor. This pattern of the ruler of Talloq advising the ruler of Gowa became the norm in the first part of the 17th century.

Another important office was Tumailalang (literally, “the person on the inside”), the trio of ministers. From the title it appears that the Tumailalang were inchange of managing everyday affairs within Gowa, there was a join tumailalang-sabannaraq office during the reign of Tumapaqsiriq Kallonna. During the subsequent reign, Tunipalannga separated these offices and by the reign of Tunijalloq, there were 2 Tumailalang, later known as the elder tumailalang toa and the younger tumailalang lolo. All holders of the Tumailalang posts were high-ranking karaengs.

List of rulers
Islamic period of Gowa started during the reign of I Mangari Daeng Manrabbia Sultan Alau'ddin in 1605.

Gallery

See also
 Bone Sultanate
 Sultanate of Ternate
 Sultanate of Tidore
 Makassar
 Gowa Regency

References

Former countries in Indonesian history
Former countries in Southeast Asia
Former sultanates
History of Sulawesi
Precolonial states of Indonesia
Former countries